Aledo High School is a public high school located in Aledo, Texas, United States and classified as a 5A school by the UIL.  It is part of the Aledo Independent School District located in south central Parker County.  Along with Aledo, students attend from the towns of Annetta and Annetta South as well as portions of Annetta North, Hudson Oaks, and Willow Park.  In 2018, the school was rated "Met Standard" by the Texas Education Agency with a two star distinction in Mathematics and Social Studies.

Demographics
The demographic breakdown of the 1,273 students enrolled for the 2017-2018 school year is as follows:
Female - 48.0%
Male - 52.0%
Native American/Alaskan - 0.5%
Asian/Pacific islander - 0.9%
Black - 2.1%
Hispanic - 12.0%
White - 81.9%
Multiracial - 2.5%

Athletics 
The Aledo Bearcats compete in the following sports:
Baseball
Basketball
Cross Country
Football
Golf
Powerlifting
Soccer
Softball
Swimming
Tennis
Track
Volleyball
Wrestling

Aledo High School's most prominent athletic team is the Bearcat  football team.  Other sports having success are the boys golf team and the Ladycat softball team who also finished ranked #1 in the country in 2008.  The 2008 Bearcat Tennis team, for the first time, was the District 6-4A champs with a perfect district season.

State titles
Baseball -
2014 (4A)
Football -
1998 (3A/D1), 2009 (4A/D2), 2010 (4A/D2), 2011 (4A/D2), 2013 (4A/D2), 2014 (5A/D1), 2016 (5A/D2), 2018 (5A/D2), 2019 (5A/D2), 2020 (5A/D2), 2022(5A/D1)
Boys Golf -
1978 (1A), 2007 (4A)
Softball
2008 (4A), 2014 (4A), 2015 (5A)

The Bearcat football team won three consecutive state titles in 4A Division II from 2009-2011 and won three consecutive state titles in 5A Division II from 2018-2020, now has a total of 10 titles, with 9 championships in the last 12 seasons (2009-2020). They are the only UIL school in Texas who have won three or more consecutive titles, twice. The Bearcat's 10 State Championships is the most in Texas. The 2013 team became the first team in high school history to score 1,000 points in a single season. After a 91-0 blowout of Western Hills a parent of the losing team filed bullying charges with the school district. A reporter for the Associated Press called Aledo a "powerhouse" in Texas high school football.

State Finalists
Football
1974 (1A), 2017 (5A/D2)
Boys Soccer
2005 (4A) 2018 (5A)
Volleyball
2012 (4A)
Girls Soccer
2017 (5A)
Softball
2021 (5A)

Extracurricular activities 
Aledo High School's most prominent sport is the Aledo High School Marching Band (AKA Bearcat Regiment).  The Regiment marching band was a UIL State Finalist in 2000 (3A), 2005 (4A), 2007 (4A), 2011 (4A), 2015, and 2017 (5A). The Regiment for the first time receive the title of Super Regional Grand Champions in the 2A class in 2008 at the San Antonio BOA. In 2010 the Bearcat Regiment was for the first time a finalist at BOA Super Regionals in San Antonio. The concert band also received TMEA Honor Band State Finals awards in 2002 (3A) and 2007 (4A), and became The TMEA Honor Band State Champions in 2015 (5A). In UIL academic competition, the Current Issues and Events team and the Literary Criticism team won the state championship in 2009, with the Current Issues and Events team successfully defending their state championship in 2010 and placing first in 2012; the Social Studies Team won the state championship (4A) in 2011 and was both district and regional champion.

UIL Lone Star Cup Champions
1998 (3A) - Co-champions with Dripping Springs.

Notable alumni 
David Barton, religious activist
Johnathan Gray, football player
Daniel Hunter, PlayRadioPlay!
Josh Jenkins, musician in Green River Ordinance
Micah Kinard, vocalist, Oh, Sleeper
Cheyenne Knight, LPGA Tour Pro Golfer
Mary Michael Patterson, theater actress and singer
Sean Henn, Former MLB Pitcher

References

External links 

 Aledo ISD webpage

Public high schools in Texas
Schools in Parker County, Texas